Christina Chang de Oliveira (formerly Dzegede, born Christina Diane Chang on 13 June 1985), known as Christina Chang, is an American-born Jamaican footballer who plays as a defender for the Jamaica women's national team.

College career
Chang attended Florida Atlantic University.

Club career
Chang played for several Women's Premier Soccer League teams, with FC Surge being the most recent.

International career
Chang represented Jamaica at the 2008 Summer Olympics qualifiers and more recently at the 2018 CONCACAF Women's Championship.

International goals
Scores and results list Jamaica's goal tally first

Personal life
Chang is of both Afro-Jamaican and Chinese Jamaican descent. Her parents hail from Harbour View, Jamaica. She was married with fellow FAU alumn Samuel Dzegede. She has since remarried to Ícaro de Oliveira.

References 

1985 births
Living people
Citizens of Jamaica through descent
Jamaican women's footballers
Women's association football defenders
Women's association football forwards
Jamaica women's international footballers

Jamaican people of Chinese descent
People from Cooper City, Florida
Sportspeople from Fort Lauderdale, Florida
Soccer players from Florida
American women's soccer players
Florida Atlantic Owls women's soccer players
California Storm players
Women's Premier Soccer League players
African-American women's soccer players
American sportspeople of Jamaican descent
American sportspeople of Chinese descent
21st-century African-American sportspeople
21st-century African-American women
20th-century African-American people
20th-century African-American women